Stefan Müller (born 24 February 1990) is a German footballer who plays for TSV Rain am Lech.

References

External links 
 
 Stefan Müller at Fupa

1990 births
Living people
People from Donauwörth
Sportspeople from Swabia (Bavaria)
German footballers
Association football forwards
2. Bundesliga players
3. Liga players
FC Ingolstadt 04 players
Footballers from Bavaria
FC Ingolstadt 04 II players
21st-century German people
TSV Rain am Lech players